Air Harrods Limited is the aircraft charter brokering arm of the Harrods company based at London Stansted Airport.
 
Customers vary immensely; news footage has shown Tony Blair travelling to the G8 summit on board an Air Harrods helicopter which was commissioned by MI5 to offset security concerns. The use of one Air Harrods helicopter was donated for a special of Challenge Anneka in 2007. The helicopter was used to transport some ill children to a choir performance.

On 7 May 2010, Air Harrods was sold as part of its parent group to a Qatari sovereign investment group in a combined deal worth £1.5bn.

References

External links

Harrods

Airlines of the United Kingdom
Harrods
Helicopter airlines
1996 establishments in England